Longman is a surname. Notable people with the surname include:

Albert Heber Longman (1880–1954), Australian naturalist and museum director
Charles Longman (1852–1934), played in the 1873 FA Cup Final
Evelyn Beatrice Longman (1874–1954), US sculptor
Frank Longman (1882–1928), American football player and coach
George Longman (1852–1938), English cricketer
George Longman (MP) (1776–1822), English politician and business
Sir Hubert Harry Longman (1856–1940), the sole Longman baronet
Irene Longman (1877–1964), Australian politician
Phillip Longman (born 1956), American demographer
Richard Longman, British racing driver
 Thomas Longman (1699–1755), English publisher who founded the publishing house of Longman
 Thomas Norton Longman (1771–1842), his great nephew, English publisher
 Thomas Longman (1804–1879), son of Thomas Norton Longman, English publisher
Tremper Longman, Old Testament scholar
William Longman (1892–1967), English croquet player

See also
Longman family tree, showing the relationship between some of the above